West Ham United won the FA Cup Final for the second time in the 1974–75 season.

Season summary
West Ham United recorded a 2–0 victory in the final against a Fulham side including former Upton Park captain Bobby Moore. Both goals were scored by Alan 'Sparrow' Taylor. West Ham finished in 13th position in the First Division.

League table

Results

Football League First Division

FA Cup

League Cup

Players

References

1974-75
English football clubs 1974–75 season
1974 sports events in London
1975 sports events in London